Dermatobranchus fortunatus is a species of sea slug, a nudibranch, a marine gastropod mollusc in the family Arminidae.

Distribution
This species occurs in the Indo-Pacific region. It was described from Java, Indonesia. It has been reported from the Great Barrier Reef, Australia, Okinawa, Japan, the Seychelles, Marshall Islands, Indonesia, Papua New Guinea, eastern Malaysia, and the Philippines.

References

Arminidae
Gastropods described in 1888